Mudbir al-Far'un (d. 1918) was a chieftain of the al-Fatlah tribe who led a rebellion against the Ottoman Empire in 1913. British records describe him as having been "one of the best-known men on the Euphrates" in the 1910s.

Biography 

Over the course of his chieftaincy, Mudbir was employed by the Ottomans as an unofficial intelligence officer, and for a short time represented the Shàmìyah on the Wilayat council.

1913 Euphrates rebellion 
In 1913, Mudbir addressed a tribal gathering in Diwaniyah, lamenting Ottoman rule:  

Subsequently, rebels led by Mudbir clashed with Ottoman forces throughout the mid-Euphrates region of Mesopotamia. Although this rebellion ended in failure, Mudbir would continue to be the al-Fatlah chieftain.

World War I 
In 1914, the Ottoman Empire called upon various chieftains to aid them in a Jihad against the British Empire. Mudbir al-Far'un was initially supportive, however, following British victories in the Mesopotamian campaign, he adopted a more neutral, if not pro-British stance. 
  
A British report described Mudbir as follows:

Mudbir condemned the Ottoman massacre that followed the 1916 uprising in Hilla:

Death and succession 
Mudbir died in September 1918. According to British records, he was succeeded by his brother, 'Mujbil al Fara'un. 'Mujbil had an elder brother, Mizhir (born ), but he did not become head as his mental incapacity made him unsuitable for this position. British records note that Mujbil was "very useful to us immediately after the occupation" and "a fairly honest and not too intelligent man who is played upon by the astuter 'Abdul Wáhid, his nephew".  

The above account of Mudbir's succession differs from that of Peter Sluglett in Britain in Iraq: Contriving King and Country (2007). In this account, Mudbir's tribal lands were divided between 5 of his children after his death, one of which was 'Abd al-Wahid Sikkar, who would later participate in the Iraqi revolt against the British and the 1935–36 Iraqi Shia revolts.

According to Ahed Al Amiri in The Role of Karbala Scholars in Confronting the British Occupation (2017), Mujbil would be "one of the prominent personalities of Al- Fatlah tribe and took part in the leadership of the Iraqi revolution in 1920". British records state Abdul Wahid was the chief of the Fatlah at the time of the 1935–36 Iraqi Shia revolts.

Historiography 
The speeches in this article are taken from Fariq al Mizhir al Fir’awn's 1952 book Al Haqa’iq al Nasi’a fil Thawra al Iraiya Sanat 1920 wa Nata’ijoha. However, Fanar Haddad's 2012 analysis doubts whether these speeches were accurately recorded (these were recorded decades after the events in question, and may reflect sentiments that developed later), and if so, is uncertain if speeches were sincere.

Notes

References 

Arab rebels
1918 deaths
Rebels from the Ottoman Empire
Tribal chiefs